Kretania pylaon, the zephyr blue, is a butterfly in the family Lycaenidae. It is found in southern Russia and the Middle East to Iran. The habitat consists of dry habitats.

This species was considered to encompass a lot of subspecies across Europe and Asia, several of which are now generally viewed as distinct species, such as Kretania hesperica (Spain), K. trappi (Alps), K. sephirus (Eastern Europe, Caucasus, Asia Minor), K. zephyrinus (Caucasus, Central Asia), K. nicholli (Levant), and K. philbyi (Levant).

The wingspan is 28–34 mm. Adults are on wing from May to July.

The larvae feed on Astragalus species, including Astragalus exscapus, Astragalus dasyanthus, Astragalus parnassi cyllenus, Astragalus angustifolius and Astragalus creticus rumelicus. They are attended by ants of the Bothriomyrmex, Tapinoma, Lasius, Camponotus, Tetramorium and Formica genera.

There is an official color called zephyr blue, which bears considerable resemblance to the color scheme of Kretania pylaon.

Description from Seitz

L. pylaon Fisch.-Waldh. (= zephyrus H.-Sch., cyane Ev.) (78 h). The male of this small Blue recalls by the peculiar violet sheen of the upperside the form planorum of argyrognomon. Beneath snowy white, the hindwing with a strong sky-blue sheen and the distal band composed of vivid golden red, strongly glossy spots. — From the Ural, South Russia and the Kirghiz steppes, in May, not rare.

Subspecies
Kretania pylaon pylaon
Kretania pylaon cleopatra Hemming, 1934
Kretania pylaon solimana (Forster, 1938)
Kretania pylaon katunensis (Bálint & Lukhtanov, 1990)
Kretania pylaon tadjikus Tschikolovetz

References

Butterflies described in 1832
Kretania
Butterflies of Asia